A retrospective (from Latin , "look back"), generally, is a look back at events that took place, or works that were produced, in the past. As a noun, retrospective has specific meanings in medicine, software development, popular culture and the arts. It is applied as an adjective, synonymous with the term retroactive, to laws, standards, and awards.

Medicine
A medical retrospective is an examination of a patient's medical history and lifestyle.

Arts and popular culture
A retrospective exhibition presents works from an extended period of an artist's activity. Similarly, a retrospective compilation album is assembled from a recording artist's past material, usually their greatest hits. A television or newsstand special about an actor, politician, or other celebrity will present a retrospective of the subject's career highlights. A leading (usually elderly) academic may be honored with a Festschrift, an honorary book of articles or a lecture series relating topically to a retrospective of the honoree's career. Celebrity roasts good-naturedly mock the career of the guest of honor, often in a retrospective format.

Awards
A retrospective or retroactive award is one which is created and then awarded to persons who would have received it before. Alternatively, a slight change to the criteria of an existing award may result in retrospective awards being presented to persons who would have won the award under present rules. Comparatively, few awards are presented retrospectively.

Law
The term is used in situations where the law (statutory, civil, or regulatory) is changed or reinterpreted, affecting acts committed before the alteration. When such changes make a previously committed lawful act now unlawful in a retroactive manner, this is known as an ex post facto law or retroactive law. Because such laws punish the accused for acts that were not unlawful when committed, they are rare, and not permissible in most legal systems. More commonly, changes retroactively worsen the legal consequences (or status) of actions that were committed, or relationships that existed, by bringing it into a more severe category than it was in when it was committed; by changing the punishment or recompense prescribed, as by adding new penalties, extending sentences, or increasing fines and damages payable; or it may alter the rules of evidence in order to make exoneration more difficult than it would have been.

Conversely, a form of retrospective law commonly called an amnesty law may decriminalize certain acts. A pardon has a similar effect, in a specific case instead of a class of cases. An in mitius change may alleviate possible consequences for unlawful acts (for example, by replacing the death sentence with lifelong imprisonment) retroactively. Finally, when a previous law is repealed or otherwise nullified, it is no longer applicable to situations to which it had been, even if such situations arose before the law was voided; this principle is known as nullum crimen, nulla poena sine praevia lege poenali.

Software development

The term is also used in software engineering, where a retrospective is a meeting held by a project team at the end of a project or process (often after an iteration) to discuss what was successful about the project or time period covered by that retrospective, what could be improved, and how to incorporate the successes and improvements in future iterations or projects. Retrospective can be done in many different ways.

In agile development, retrospectives play a very important role in iterative and incremental development. At the end of every iteration, a retrospective is held to look for ways to improve the process for the next iteration.

Standards
In the context of scientific and technical standards, retrospectivity applies current norms to material that pre-dates new rules. An example of a retrospective or retroactive standard is the International Code of Zoological Nomenclature (ICZN Code), a convention which governs the formal scientific naming of animals, of which the 4th edition is effective since 2000. All previous editions of the ICZN Code, or previous other rules and conventions, are disregarded today, and the scientific names published in former times are to be evaluated only under the present edition of the ICZN Code.

See also
 After action report
 After-action review
 Debriefing
 Lessons learned
 Morbidity and mortality conference
 Performance appraisal

References

External links

Film genres
Visual arts exhibitions